Greg Steuerwald (born September 12, 1952) is an American politician and attorney from Indiana. Steuerwald is a member of the Indiana House of Representatives from the 40th district since 2007.

References

1952 births
Living people
Republican Party members of the Indiana House of Representatives
21st-century American politicians